Jessica Verrilli is an entrepreneur, venture capitalist and angel investor, former vice president of corporate development and strategy at Twitter and current general partner at GV.

Currently, Verrilli is general partner at GV since May 2018. She served as a partner at Google Ventures and rejoined the firm in May 2018.

Furthermore, as an angel investor, Verrilli co-founded the women's investing group #Angels.

Education 
Verrilli holds a B.A. in human biology from Stanford University, where she was selected as a Stanford Mayfield Fellow in 2007 and participated on the varsity women's lacrosse team.

Career 
Verrilli joined the venture capital firm Venrock in early 2008 as an investment associate.

Afterwards, Verrilli served as the senior director of corporate development and strategy at Twitter from 2009 until 2017, focusing on corporate development and strategy while the social network grew from a small startup into a multinational corporation and publicly traded company.

References 

Living people
Year of birth missing (living people)
Angel investors